Hali Moriah Candido Long (born January 21, 1995) is a footballer who plays as a center back. Born in the United States, she represents the Philippines women's national team.

Early life and education
Hali Long was born in Cape Girardeau, Missouri to Lilie Candido and David Long. She studied at the Francis Howell North High School in St. Charles lettering in all four years in her secondary education and at the University of Arkansas at Little Rock. She was named to the Sun Belt Conference Commissioner's List for maintaining a GPA (grade point average) of 3.0 or better for the 2013–14 and 2014–15 school years.

Career

Youth and college
Long played for the under-18 team of Lou Fusz-Wipk, helping the youth club win three state championships. She played for the Little Rock Trojans women's soccer team from 2013 to 2016. She made her first career assist in 2014 against Southern and her first career goal in 2016 against Memphis. In 2015 she played the most minutes among players of the Little Rock Trojans women's soccer team. She also started every game, one of only three players on that year’s roster to do so.

International
Long was born in the United States to an American father and Filipino mother. In June 2016, Long joined a training camp by the Philippines women's national football team. She was then selected to be part of the Philippine squad to participate at the 2016 AFF Women's Championship in Myanmar. This was the first time that a Trojans player competed on a senior national team. She also played at the 2018 AFC Women's Asian Cup qualifiers in April 2017 scoring a hat-trick in the match against Tajikistan. The team managed to secure qualification for the final tournament in Jordan.

She was also part of the Philippine roster for the 2017 Southeast Asian Games and the 2018. and 2022 AFC Women's Asian Cup.

International goals
Scores and results list the Philippines' goal tally first.

Honours

International

Philippines
Southeast Asian Games third place: 2021
AFF Women's Championship: 2022

Club

Kaya–Iloilo
SingaCup Women's Football Championship: 2022

References

1995 births
Living people
Soccer players from Missouri
Filipino women's footballers
Philippines women's international footballers
American women's soccer players
Citizens of the Philippines through descent
Filipino people of American descent
American sportspeople of Filipino descent
Women's association football central defenders
Competitors at the 2017 Southeast Asian Games
Competitors at the 2019 Southeast Asian Games
People from St. Charles County, Missouri
Little Rock Trojans women's soccer players
Southeast Asian Games bronze medalists for the Philippines
Southeast Asian Games medalists in football
Competitors at the 2021 Southeast Asian Games